The 1990 Wyoming Cowboys football team represented the University of Wyoming in the 1990 NCAA Division I-A football season. It was the Cowboys' 95th season and they competed as a member of the Western Athletic Conference (WAC). The team was led by head coach Paul Roach, in his fourth year, and played their home games at War Memorial Stadium in Laramie, Wyoming. They finished with a record of nine wins and four losses (9–4, 5–3 WAC) and with a loss in the Copper Bowl. The Cowboys offense scored 327 points, while the defense allowed 297 points.

Schedule

Reference:

Team players in the NFL
The following were selected in the 1991 NFL Draft.

References

Wyoming
Wyoming Cowboys football seasons
Wyoming Cowboys football